D.A.V. Academy, Tanda  is located in the mid of the town of Tanda, in Uttar Pradesh province, India.

Description
This school is a co-educational institute, providing education in a science as well as in commerce stream up to 10+2. This school particularly supports the education of children from all communities in the Ambedkar Nagar District of Uttar Pradesh.

Maharishi Dayanand Saraswati 
Drawing fresh inspiration from Vedas Swami Dayanad Saraswati, the founder of the Arya Samaj and "The Great Path Maker of Modern India" as Rabindra Nath Tagore Aptly Desired him led a crusade against superstitious and pernicious practices that bedevilled the inhabitants of this ancient land.
He was a great son of mother India and raised his stentorian voice in "Satyartha Prakash" against foreign rule and set before us the idea of swaraj and Swadesh and advocate the eradication of untouchability , emancipation of women, widow re-marriage. This prophet of emancipation and equality tried to revolutionise the spiritual life of the country by giving the "Vedic Message of Intellectual and Moral Freedom" to the people of Bharat Varsha.

D.A.V. MOVEMENT (Dayanand Anglo Vedic Movement) 
"D.A.V. Movement was first founded in year 1885 under the aegis of the Late Lala Lajpat Rai."
The very first D.A.V. School was established in 1886 in Lahore under the competent leadership of Mahatma Hansraj. He dedicated his life to the movement by fulfilling his pledge of 25 years of honorary services as first Principle of the first D.A.V. College at Lahore.

D.A.V. Academy Tanda(Ambedkar Nagar) 
To bring a dynamic and harmonious personality of the future citizens of global Society and to infuse in them lofty ideals of Vedic Culture. "The Arya Vidya Prachar Sangh, Tanda" set up a school, for girls named "Mishrilal Arya Kanya Inter College" for about more than 70 year ago.
Recognizing the basic importance of English in higher education and preparing dynamic citizen of tomorrow to meet the challenges of the global society "The Arya Vidya Prachar Sangh Tanda" has started a Co- Education English Medium school named "D.A.V. Academy" is rendering a unique education services to this Area.

References

External links

"D.A.V. Academy,Tanda".www.thelearningpoint.net
"D.A.V. Academy,Tanda". www.icbse.com.

Private schools in Uttar Pradesh
Educational institutions established in 2004
2004 establishments in Uttar Pradesh
Rampur district